Otto Crusius may refer to:

 Ludwig Friedrich Otto Baumgarten-Crusius, (1788–1842), German Protestant divine
 Otto Crusius (1857–1918), German classical scholar